FloristWare is an order-taking and Point of Sale (POS)/Customer Relationship Management (CRM) system for retail florists.

Systems of this type are intended to aid retail florists with all aspects of their business. Features designed to speed order-taking and help with accounting, performance reporting, marketing, etc. are standard in products of this nature.

History
FloristWare was developed over a four-year period starting in 2001. Development included ongoing focus groups with florists across North America. The intention was to have the people that would use the software play a pivotal role in shaping how it looked, worked and performed.

FloristWare was released to beta testers in September 2005 and went into wide release in January 2006. The current version of FloristWare is 4.0.716, which was released in January 2016. Version 5.0 is currently being tested for release in March 2016.

Other information
FloristWare is considered an "independent" POS system in that is independent of wire services such as FTD or Teleflora. These companies and others like them offer their own proprietary POS systems for florists. It also uses a "Question & Answer" interface. Each step asks the user one question, which in turn determines the next step until the desired task has been completed.

Industry Sponsorships
FloristWare works with non-profit associations serving the retail floral industry like SAF to sponsor educational content at their conventions and events. Because the focus of so much education in the floral industry is on design FloristWare tries, with some exceptions, to focus on the business side of the industry. The idea is that by helping florists enjoy greater success from a business standpoint they will have more opportunities to express themselves creatively.

Educational Version
A free version of the software is available to schools and training programs that offer courses and programs related to floral design and the retail flower business. Most programs focus on design and the goal of the educational version is to help schools provide students with additional skills that will make them more employable as they enter the workforce.

References

External links 
 FloristWare 
 FloristWare on Google+ 

Business software for Windows
Business software for macOS
Customer relationship management software
Workflow applications
Floral industry